"Don't Look Back in Anger" is a song by English rock band Oasis. It was written by the band's guitarist and main songwriter Noel Gallagher. The song was produced by Gallagher and Owen Morris. Released on 19 February 1996 as the fifth single from their second studio album, (What's the Story) Morning Glory? (1995), it became Oasis's second single to reach #1 on the UK Singles Chart, earning a quadruple-platinum sales certification in the UK. It was the first Oasis single with lead vocals by Noel, who had previously only sung lead on B-sides, instead of his brother Liam. Noel would later sing lead vocals on six other singles.

It is one of the band's signature songs, and was played at almost every live show from its release to the dissolution of the band in 2009. In 2012, it was ranked #1 on a list of the "50 Most Explosive Choruses" by NME, and the same year it was voted the fourth-most-popular No. 1 single of the last 60 years in the UK by the public in conjunction with the Official Charts Company's 60th anniversary. In 2015, Rolling Stone readers voted it the second-greatest Britpop song after "Common People" by Pulp. On 29 May 2017, Absolute Radio 90s broadcast a programme counting down the top 50 songs written by Noel Gallagher to mark his 50th birthday, with the song being voted No. 1. In August 2020, the song was voted as the greatest song of the 1990s by listeners of Absolute Radio 90s as part of celebrations for the station's tenth anniversary.

Background and writing
Noel Gallagher was so excited about the potential of the song when he first wrote it that he used an acoustic set to perform a work-in-progress version, without the second verse and with a few other slight lyrical differences, at an Oasis concert at the Sheffield Arena on 22 April 1995. He said before playing that he'd only written it the previous Tuesday (18 April 1995) and that he didn't even have a title for it yet.

Noel Gallagher said of the song, "It reminds me of a cross between "All the Young Dudes" and something the Beatles might have done." Of the character "Sally" referred to in the song, he commented, "I don't actually know anybody called Sally. It's just a word that fit, y'know, might as well throw a girl's name in there." He explained the song by saying, "It's about not being upset about the things you might have said or done yesterday, which is quite appropriate at the moment. It's about looking forward rather than looking back. I hate people who look back on the past or talk about what might have been."

In August 2007, Gallagher told Uncut magazine, "We were in Paris playing with the Verve, and I had the chords for that song and started writing it. We were due to play two days later. Our first-ever big arena gig, it's called Sheffield Arena now. At the sound check, I was strumming away on the acoustic guitar, and rkid (Liam Gallagher) said, 'What's that you're singin'?' I wasn't singing anyway, I was just making it up. And our kid said, 'Are you singing, 'So Sally can wait'?' And I was like—that's genius! So I started singing, 'So Sally can wait.' I remember going back to the dressing room and writing it out. It all came really quickly after that." Gallagher claims that the character "Lyla", from Oasis's 2005 single, is Sally's sister. In the interview on the DVD released with the special edition of Stop the Clocks, he also revealed that a girl approached him and asked him if Sally was the same girl mentioned in the Stone Roses track "Sally Cinnamon". He replied that he had never thought of that, but thought it was a good reference anyway.

In a 2019 Esquire magazine interview, Gallagher stated, "I remember writing it in Paris on a rainy night. We had just played a strip club: our set finished, the strippers came on. We were nothing, an insignificant little band. And I remember going back to my hotel room and writing it, and thinking, 'That'll be pretty good when we record it.' If I'd have known that night what I know now about people playing it at fucking funerals and weddings, I'd never have finished the song. Too much pressure."

Gallagher admits that certain lines from the song are lifted from John Lennon: "I got this tape in the United States that had apparently been burgled from the Dakota Hotel and someone had found these cassettes. Lennon was starting to record his memoirs on tape. He's going on about 'trying to start a revolution from me [sic] bed, because they said the brains I had went to my head.' I thought, 'Thank you, I'll take that!'" The line "revolution from me bed" refers to Lennon's notorious bed-ins in 1969 as Gallagher was reading Revolution in the Head: The Beatles' Records and the Sixties published in 1994. The piano in the introduction of the song strongly resembles Lennon's "Imagine", as well as "Watching the Wheels".

As Oasis are often criticised for borrowing parts of other artists' songs, Gallagher commented on the intro's similarity to "Imagine":

Live performances
The song became a favourite at Oasis's live performances.

Noel Gallagher encouraged the crowd to sing along and often kept quiet during the first chorus, allowing the fans instead to sing along while he played the song's guitar part. During the Dig Out Your Soul Tour, Noel abandoned the song's previous, full-band live arrangement in favour of a much slower, primarily acoustic arrangement. From 2008 through to Oasis's break-up, the song was performed by Gallagher on his Gibson J-200 acoustic guitar backed up by Gem Archer on electric guitar, Jay Darlington playing keyboards and Chris Sharrock playing tambourine. On 11 and 12 July 2009, during performances of the song at London's Wembley Stadium, Gallagher did not sing a word; instead, he stood back, played guitar, and allowed the crowd to sing the entire song. Since 2011, he has alternated between the acoustic version and the original arrangement when playing the song with his solo project, Noel Gallagher's High Flying Birds.

Oasis became the first act since the Jam to perform two songs on the same showing of Top of the Pops, performing "Don't Look Back in Anger", followed by their cover of Slade's "Cum on Feel the Noize", also on the single.

In June 2017, Liam Gallagher performed an a cappella version of the song at Glastonbury, making it the first time he had performed the song rather than Noel.

Manchester Arena bombing 
Following the Manchester Arena bombing on 22 May 2017 in the band's hometown of Manchester, the song was used by the people of Manchester in remembrance of the bombing's 22 victims and to show the city's spirit. The song was sung by students of Manchester's Chetham's music school on 23 May, and on 25 May it was spontaneously sung by the crowd gathered for a minute of silence in the city centre. The woman who started the singing told The Guardian, "I love Manchester, and Oasis is part of my childhood. "Don't Look Back in Anger"—that's what this is about: we can't be looking backwards to what happened, we have to look forwards to the future." The song re-entered the charts, along with Ariana Grande's "One Last Time," which was No. 1 on the iTunes single charts as of 26 May. On 27 May, the song was performed as a tribute by 50,000 audience members of a performance by the Courteeners in Manchester.

It was performed by Coldplay's Chris Martin and Jonny Buckland on either side of Ariana Grande at the One Love Manchester concert on 4 June 2017. Martin introduced the song by saying "Ariana, you've been singing a lot for us, so I think we in Britain want to sing for you. This is called "Don't Look Back in Anger", and this is from us to you".

It was also performed by the military band of the French Republican Guard on 13 June 2017, at the France versus England football match at the Stade de France, as a tribute to the victims of the attacks in Manchester and, more recently, London.

Release
The single's picture sleeve contains a photo by Brian Cannon. He intended the cover as a homage to an incident where Ringo Starr, having briefly left the Beatles in 1968 during the recording of the White Album, was persuaded to return and George Harrison decorated Starr's drum kit in red, white and blue flowers to show their appreciation.

The B-side "Step Out" was originally intended for the (What's the Story) Morning Glory? album but was taken off after Stevie Wonder requested 10 per cent of the royalties as the chorus bore a similarity to his song "Uptight (Everything's Alright)". Because of this, Wonder, Henry Cosby and Sylvia Moy received credit for writing the song, along with Noel.

The song's chart success coincided with its usage at the end of the final episode of the BBC television drama Our Friends in the North. The show's producers had included the track without knowing it was going to be released as a single.

Critical reception
"Don't Look Back in Anger" was met with high critical praise and it became a commercial hit. Larry Flick from Billboard said, "Noel Gallagher reveals a deft sense of timing and craft that turn his improprieties into masterful pop gems." Music Week rated the song five out of five, picking it as Single of the Week. They wrote, "Cheekily opening with John Lennon's Imagine riff, another Beatles-inspired single which will turn on the fans on Brits day. The inclusion of the ill-advised Slade cover of Cum On Feel The Noize is a low point, however." 

In a 2006 readers' poll conducted by Q magazine, "Don't Look Back in Anger" was voted the 20th-best song of all time. In May 2007, NME magazine placed "Don't Look Back in Anger" at No. 14 in its list of the "50 Greatest Indie Anthems Ever".

Chart performance
The song reached No. 1 in the singles charts of Ireland and the United Kingdom, and it was a moderate success by reaching the top 60 in various countries. The song was the 10th-biggest-selling single of 1996 in the UK. It is Oasis's second-biggest-selling single in the UK (after "Wonderwall"), going quadruple platinum in the process. The song returned to the UK charts in 2017 following Chris Martin and Jonny Buckland's cover version at the One Love Manchester concert, reaching No. 25. "Don't Look Back in Anger" is Oasis's sixth-biggest Billboard hit in the US, reaching the No. 10 spot on the Modern Rock Tracks for the week of 22 June 1996.

Music video
The video for the song was directed by Nigel Dick and features Patrick Macnee, the actor who played John Steed in the 1960s television series The Avengers, apparently a favourite of Oasis. It was filmed at 1145 Arden Road in Pasadena, California on 4 December 1995. It features the band being driven by Macnee in a black cab to a mansion similar to the Playboy Mansion and performing the song there; a group of women dressed in white also occasionally lip sync to the lyrics. While filming the video, drummer Alan White met future wife Liz Atkins. They married on 13 August 1997 at Studley Priory in Oxfordshire, but later divorced.

There are two uploads of the music video. One being posted by the band themselves in 2008 with over 229 million views, and another posted in collaboration with Vevo in 2014 with over 120 million views.

Track listing
All songs were written by Noel Gallagher except where noted.

 UK CD and cassette single 
 "Don't Look Back in Anger"
 "Step Out" (Gallagher, Wonder, Cosby, Moy)
 "Underneath the Sky"
 "Cum On Feel the Noize" (Holder, Lea)

 UK 7-inch single 
A. "Don't Look Back in Anger"
B. "Step Out" (Gallagher, Wonder, Cosby, Moy)

 UK 12-inch single 
A1. "Don't Look Back in Anger"
B1. "Step Out" (Gallagher, Wonder, Cosby, Moy)
B2. "Underneath the Sky"

 US CD and cassette single 
 "Don't Look Back in Anger"
 "Cum On Feel the Noize" (Holder, Lea)

Personnel
Oasis
 Noel Gallagher – lead vocals, lead guitars, Mellotron, EBow
 Paul "Bonehead" Arthurs – piano, rhythm guitar, Hammond organ
 Paul "Guigsy" McGuigan – bass guitar
 Alan White – drums, shaker, tambourine

Additional personnel
 Owen Morris – Kurzweil strings

Charts and certifications

Weekly charts

Year-end charts

Certifications

Release history

References

External links
 

Oasis (band) songs
1995 songs
1996 singles
1990s ballads
Creation Records singles
Epic Records singles
Irish Singles Chart number-one singles
Music videos directed by Nigel Dick
Number-one singles in Scotland
Rock ballads
Songs written by Noel Gallagher
UK Singles Chart number-one singles